Herbert Hales (21 November 1908 – 1982) was a footballer who played in the Football League for Nottingham Forest, Preston North End, Chesterfield, Stockport County, Rochdale and Stoke City.

Career
Hales was born in Kettering and began his career with local side Desborough Town. He joined Nottingham Forest in 1928 and played three matches before playing for Northampton Town and Peterborough & Fletton United. In December 1930 he joined Stoke City and played in a 1–1 draw with Bradford City on boxing day. It turned out to be his only senior match for Stoke and he left for Preston North End. After two seasons at Deepdale he had another two at Chesterfield and then one season spells with Stockport County and Rochdale. He finished his career with non-league teams Burton Town and Kidderminster Harriers.

Career statistics
Source:

References

1908 births
1982 deaths
Sportspeople from Kettering
Association football outside forwards
English footballers
Desborough Town F.C. players
Nottingham Forest F.C. players
Northampton Town F.C. players
Peterborough & Fletton United F.C. players
Stoke City F.C. players
Preston North End F.C. players
Chesterfield F.C. players
Stockport County F.C. players
Rochdale A.F.C. players
Burton Town F.C. players
Kidderminster Harriers F.C. players
English Football League players